The men's 4 × 100 metres relay event at the 1999 Summer Universiade was held at the Estadio Son Moix in Palma de Mallorca, Spain on 12 and 13 July.

Results

Heats

Final

References

Athletics at the 1999 Summer Universiade
1999